2018 Belarusian First League is the 28th season of 2nd level football in Belarus. It started in April and finished in November 2018.

Team changes from 2017 season
Two best teams of 2017 Belarusian First League (Luch Minsk and Smolevichi-STI) were promoted to Belarusian Premier League. They were replaced by two lowest placed teams of 2017 Belarusian Premier League table (Slavia Mozyr and Naftan Novopolotsk).

Two lowest placed teams of the last season (Osipovichi and Neman-Agro Stolbtsy) relegated to the Second League. They were replaced by two best teams of 2017 Second League (UAS Zhitkovichi and Chist).

In March 2018, Torpedo Minsk were granted additional promotion to Belarusian Premier League to replace Krumkachy Minsk (who failed to obtain a Premier League and were demoted to the Second League). Torpedo were not replaced any other team due to the lack of applicants, and the league was reduced to 15 clubs for the season.

Teams summary

League table

Results

Top goalscorers

Updated to games played on 10 November 2018 Source: football.by

See also
2018 Belarusian Premier League
2017–18 Belarusian Cup
2018–19 Belarusian Cup

External links
 Official site 

Belarusian First League seasons
2
Belarus
Belarus